The 1998  Philippine Basketball Association (PBA) rookie draft was an event at which teams drafted players from the amateur ranks. The annual rookie draft was held on December 22, 1997, at the Glorietta Mall in Makati.

Round 1

Round 2

Round 3

Round 4

Notes
The Formula Shell Zoom Masters traded first overall pick Danilo Ildefonso to the San Miguel Beermen in exchange for second overall pick Noy Castillo on draft day.
Ginebra San Miguel traded the draft rights to Steven Smith to the San Miguel Beermen in exchange for Paul Alvarez.
The San Miguel Beermen's fifth overall draft pick William Antonio and the Alaska Milkmen's twelfth overall draft pick Stephen Antonio are brothers.

References

draft
Philippine Basketball Association draft